Events in the year 1953 in the Republic of India.

Incumbents
 President of India – Rajendra Prasad
 Prime Minister of India – Jawaharlal Nehru
 Vice President of India - Sarvepalli Radhakrishnan
 Chief Justice of India – M. Patanjali Sastri

Governors
 Andhra Pradesh – Chandulal Madhavlal Trivedi
 Assam – Jairamdas Daulatram
 Bihar – R. R. Diwakar
 Maharashtra – Raja Sir Maharaj Singh
 Odisha – Fazal Ali 
 Punjab – Chandulal Madhavlal Trivedi (until 11 March), Chandeshwar Prasad Narayan Singh (starting 11 March)
 Rajasthan – Maharaj Man Singh II
 Uttar Pradesh – Kanhaiyalal Maneklal Munshi 
 West Bengal – Harendra Coomar Mookerjee

Events
 National income - 116,067 million
 15 June – Indian Airlines created.
 Air India nationalised.
 8 August - Prime Minister of Jammu and Kashmir Sheikh Abdullah and his government dismissed by Sadr-e-Riyasat Karan Singh.
 15 September - Police firing against labourers at Mattancherry for protesting against the chappa system, an early work-guarantee scheme.
 1 October – Andhra State was formed carving Telugu speaking regions out of erstwhile Madras Presidency.

Law
 Government of India sets up first Backward classes commission headed by Kaka Kalelkar.

Births
7 January – K. Bhagyaraj, director, actor, script-writer and producer
 1 April – Hari Chand, long-distance runner
 8 May, Devi Prasad Shetty, top India's leading heart surgeon and social entrepreneur
 15 May – Varaprasad Rao Velagapalli, politician and former member of parliament from Tirupati.
 27 May –  Ranjit Sinha, police officer (died 2021)
 15 June – Kambhampati Hari Babu, politician and member of parliament from Visakhapatnam.
 11 July – Suresh Prabhu, Politician, Railway Minister since 2014.
24 July  Srividya, actress (died 2006). 
30 August – Avinash Balkrishna Patwardhan, engineer, author and Indian classical music researcher,

Deaths
22 November – Syed Sulaiman Nadvi, historian, biographer, littérateur and scholar of Islam (born 1884).
10 December – Abdullah Yusuf Ali, Islamic scholar who translated the Qur'an into English (born 1872).

See also 
 Bollywood films of 1953

References 

 
India
Years of the 20th century in India